Illian Gerardo Hernández Vargas (born 12 April 2000) is a Mexican professional footballer who plays as a forward for Liga MX club Pachuca.

Career statistics

Club

Honours
Pachuca
Liga MX: Apertura 2022

References

External links
 
 
 

2000 births
Living people
Mexican footballers
Association football forwards
Ascenso MX players
Liga MX players
Liga Premier de México players
C.F. Pachuca players
Mineros de Zacatecas players
Footballers from Zacatecas
People from Fresnillo